Miguel Mejía is a Puerto Rican professional baseball pitcher who is currently a free agent.

Career
Mejía played for the Saitama Seibu Lions of Nippon Professional Baseball in 2015.

On November 17, 2017, Mejía signed with the Diablos Rojos del México of the Mexican League. He was released on July 2, 2018.

On June 20, 2019, Mejía signed with the Piratas de Campeche of the Mexican League. He was released on January 10, 2020.

References

External links
, NPB , CPBL

1988 births
African-American baseball players
American expatriate baseball players in Japan
American expatriate baseball players in Taiwan
American people of Puerto Rican descent
Baseball pitchers
Bridgeport Bluefish players
Brother Elephants players
Connecticut Tigers players
Criollos de Caguas players
Diablos Rojos del México players
Gigantes de Carolina players
Greensboro Grasshoppers players
Gulf Coast Tigers players
Iowa Cubs players
Jamestown Jammers players
Lakeland Flying Tigers players
Lamigo Monkeys players
Liga de Béisbol Profesional Roberto Clemente pitchers
Living people
Mexican League baseball pitchers
Nippon Professional Baseball pitchers
Piratas de Campeche players
Saitama Seibu Lions players
Sportspeople from Brooklyn
Baseball players from New York City
Tennessee Smokies players
West Michigan Whitecaps players
Yaquis de Obregón players
2017 World Baseball Classic players
21st-century African-American sportspeople
20th-century African-American people